Machesney may refer to:

Machesney Park, Illinois, a village in Winnebago County, Illinois, United States
Machesney Airport, a former airport in Machesney Park, Illinois

People with the surname
Daren Machesney (born 1986), Canadian ice hockey player